Khulna-5 is a constituency represented in the Jatiya Sangsad (National Parliament) of Bangladesh since 2008 by Narayan Chandra Chanda of the Awami League.

Boundaries 
The constituency encompasses Dumuria and Phultala upazilas, Khan Jahan Ali Thana, Gilatala Cantonment, and Atra Gilatala Union.

History 
The constituency was created for the first general elections in newly independent Bangladesh, held in 1973.

Members of Parliament

Elections

Elections in the 2010s 
Narayan Chandra Chanda was re-elected unopposed in the 2014 general election after opposition parties withdrew their candidacies in a boycott of the election.

Elections in the 2000s 

Salah Uddin Yusuf died in 2000. Narayan Chandra Chandu was elected in a December 2000 by-election.

Elections in the 1990s

References

External links
 

Parliamentary constituencies in Bangladesh
Khulna District